Blade Wars is a free-to-play massively-multiplayer online role-playing game (MMORPG) first released in China in 2007. It was developed and published by Changyou.com. Blade Wars is inspired by martial arts and takes place in a fantasy universe where three playable races, the Abyssals, Humans, and Immortals battle for dominance in PVP encounters.

Gameplay 
The game features F2P martial arts and uses an isometric view and employs a control scheme similar to the one used in RuneScape and the Diablo game series.

The battle system is based on a dynamic algorithm that factors in a player's level, the time between attacks and the enemy's position. Players are able to feign attacks or dodge an opponent's strikes. Skill combinations can be customized to result in powerful attacks, which generate extra damage during a battle.

The game incorporates many of the features found in Changyou's previously released title, Dragon Oath. Mounts, trading, guild battles and daily events are included in Blade Wars. Unlike Dragon Oath, Blade Wars uses a 2.5D graphics engine, mixing 2D and 3D graphics into an isometric view.

The game allows players to use strategy in customizing the fighting system and encourages skilled players to challenge each other for supremacy. After choosing one of the five classes available (Knight, Assassin, Shura, Warlock, or Warrior), players will be able to dive and explore a visually stunning world filled with challenges and fierce wars.

Development and release 

Originally released in China in 2007, Blade Wars received an English adaptation and was launched on American and British markets in 2010.

Reception 
Blade Wars received an award in 2009 from the Chinese gaming site Wangyou for Original Title of the Year.

References

External links 
 
 Official North American website
 Official European website
 Official Malaysian website
 Official Chinese website

Fantasy massively multiplayer online role-playing games
Windows games
Windows-only games
Video games developed in China
Video games based on novels
Video games with isometric graphics
Free-to-play video games
2007 video games